Gerardo Aguilar Sainz is a Mexican footballer playing in midfield for Real Estelí FC. He was born 28 March 1990 in Orizaba, Veracruz and was brought up in Saltillo, Coahuila.

Career

Second Division
Gerardo Aguilar Sainz began his professional career in 2007 in the Second Division of the Mexican Football League, playing for Club Deportivo Chivas, when the team twice became divisional champion. In 2009, he moved to Real Saltillo Soccer Club, with which he remained until 2011, scoring 8 goals. He played for Querétaro F.C. in 2011 and 2012, scoring 3 goals. In 2012, he moved to Deportivo Tepic F.C., in the Liga Premier de Ascenso, part of the Second Division, and scored 3 goals while there.

Ascenso MX
Aguilar moved up one tier in 2014 when he transferred to Club de Futbol Celaya, playing twice in the Copa MX and scoring one goal.

Loros de la Universidad de Colima 
In 2015 Aguilar moved to the Second Division team Loros de la Universidad de Colima. The team won promotion to the Ascenso MX league that same year.

Real Estelí Fútbol Club 
Aguilar is currently playing for the Nicaraguan First Division team Real Estelí Fútbol Club. Real Estelí is one of the two top Nicaraguan teams, along with Diriangén FC. Matches between the two teams are known as the "National Classic".

International competitions 
 Copa Dallas 2007
 Copa Gradisca (Italy) 2007
 Copa Promissao (Brazil) 2007
 Copa Internacional Chivas 2008 - champions

References

External links
 

1990 births
Living people
People from Orizaba
Association football midfielders
Mexican footballers
Querétaro F.C. footballers
Coras de Nayarit F.C. footballers
Club Celaya footballers
Real Estelí F.C. players
Liga MX players
Mexican expatriate footballers
Expatriate footballers in Nicaragua
Mexican expatriate sportspeople in Nicaragua